Country Code: +243
International Call Prefix: 00
Trunk Prefix: 0

Calling formats
To call in the Democratic Republic of the Congo, the following format is used:
 xxx xx xx - Calls within an area code
 0y xxx xx xx - Calls within the Democratic Republic of the Congo
 +243 y xxx xx xx - Calls from outside the Democratic Republic of the Congo
 +243 82 xxx xx xx - Call from outside the Democratic Republic of the Congo toward mobiles

List of area codes in the Democratic Republic of the Congo

References

 ITU allocations list

Congo, Democratic Republic of the
Telecommunications in the Democratic Republic of the Congo
Telephone numbers

+243895718042